Altıkulaç is a village in the Abana District of Kastamonu Province in Turkey. Its population is 89 (2021).

References

Villages in Abana District